Lilium cernuum  is a species of lily native to Korea, the Primorye region of Russia, and northeastern China (Provinces of Jilin + Liaoning).

Lilium cernuum typically grows to 50 cm tall. The flowers are white to purple, though usually pink with maroon spots, and are scented. The species is similar in many respects to Lilium pumilum. The name cernuum refers to its nodding (hanging) flowers.

References

Flora of Korea
Flora of Manchuria
Flora of the Russian Far East
cernuum
Plants described in 1901